The Birth of Greece (UK title: Ancient Greece: Utopia and Reality) is a 1990 illustrated monograph on the history of ancient Greece. Written by French historian Pierre Lévêque, and published by Éditions Gallimard as the 86th volume in the "Découvertes" collection.

Synopsis 
The Birth of Greece covers ancient Greek history from roughly 2000 BC to the conquest of Greece by Philip II of Macedon and his son Alexander the Great's empire. The book comprises three chapters: the first covers the Greek bronze age and the Minoan and Mycenaean civilisations; the second the archaic period; and the third the classical period, starting from the Greco-Persian wars and ending with Alexander the Great.  This is followed by an appendix of "documents", made up of both extracts from ancient sources, and from other writings about ancient Greece.

Contents 

Body text
 Opening: a succession of full-page illustrations showing Sir Arthur John Evans' reconstruction of the palace at Knossos, and the reconstruction of the palace of Nestor at Pylos by Piet de Jong
 Chapter I: "A Sumptuous Age of Bronze"
 Chapter II: "The Archaic Period: An Age of Simmering Creativity"
 Chapter III: "The Classical Balance: Reality and Utopianism"

Documents
 The Exaltation of Beauty, the Greek Ideal: The Apollo Belvedere
 Religion in Ancient Athens
 Prayer on the Acropolis
 The Syllabic Scripts of the Bronze Age Palaces
 The Pantheon as Reflected in Mycenaean Tablets
 The Evolution of Attic Pottery
 Solon, Legislator and Poet
 Naucratis: A Greek Concession on Egyptian Soil
 Two Great Pre-Socratic Philosophers from the Beginning of the 5th Century ʙᴄ
 Democrats and Democratic Regimes of the 6th and 5th Centuries ʙᴄ
 An Opponent of Athenian Democracy: Pseudo-Xenophon, the "Old Oligarch"
 An Orgiastic Cult: Maenadism
 A Stirring Appeal for Patriotism
 Chronology of Ancient Greece ([6000–323 ʙᴄ])
 Further Reading
 List of Illustrations
 Index
 Photograph Credits/Text Credits

Reception 
In its book review section, the archaeology magazine Minerva gave a positive review to the book: "There can be no better  introduction to the many aspects of ancient Greece."

Peter Walcot's review for Greece & Rome felt that the pictures were wonderful, but the text he found disappointing: "[The book], like its predecessors in the 'New Horizons' series, is a translation from the French and, more importantly, most imaginatively illustrated and inexpensively priced. It is the text which I find disappointing: earlier titles had a particular theme whereas this volume just sketches the story of the Greeks and their achievement from Minoans to Macedonians. [...] Still, who is going to bother overmuch with the text when the pictures are so wonderful?"

The Belgian historian  wrote in the journal : "The reading of this book is warmly recommended to students and to any Greek history lover, from the Bronze Age to the 4th century BC. Remarkable synthesis, which goes to the essential; here is finally, one would be tempted to write, a work of popularization which does not content itself with presenting a succession of historical facts. The reader discovers, with enormous intellectual satisfaction, a coherent thought, which makes us experience the birth of the city and highlights the fruitful originality of Greek society. This fruitfulness is emphasized not only by the text, which concludes with the debt of our system of thought to this ancient civilization, but also by the illustration, the side-by-side arrangement of Classical and Neoclassical artworks, as if to remind us also of Greece's place in the imagination of later centuries."

See also 
 Aegean civilization
 Minoan civilization
 Archaic Greece
 Classical Greece
 Mycenaean Greece
 Greek Dark Ages
 Classical antiquity
 Classical studies

References

External links 
  
 
 

1990 non-fiction books
20th-century history books
History books about ancient Greece
Découvertes Gallimard